, stylized as WIT Studio, is a Japanese animation studio founded on June 1, 2012, by producers at Production I.G as a subsidiary of IG Port. It is headquartered in Musashino, Tokyo, with Production I.G producer George Wada as president and Tetsuya Nakatake, also a producer at Production I.G., as a director of the studio. The studio gained notability for producing the first three seasons of Attack on Titan and has also produced other notable series such as Ranking of Kings, Spy × Family, and the first seasons of The Ancient Magus' Bride and Vinland Saga.

Establishment
The studio was founded by George Wada, a former employee of Production I.G, in 2012. After its founding, Tetsuya Nakatake was placed as the representative director of the studio. Several other former Production I.G staff members joined Wit after its founding, including animation directors Kyōji Asano and Satoshi Kadowaki, and director Tetsurō Araki, all of whom worked together on Attack on Titan.

Works

Television series

Films

OVA/ONAs

Video games

Music videos

Notes

References

External links
  
 

 
IG Port
Japanese animation studios
Japanese companies established in 2012
Mass media companies established in 2012
Animation studios in Tokyo
Musashino, Tokyo
Crunchyroll Anime Awards winners